The second government of Juan Manuel Moreno was formed on 26 July 2022, following the latter's election as President of the Regional Government of Andalusia by the Parliament of Andalusia on 21 July and his swearing-in on 23 July, as a result of the People's Party (PP) emerging as the largest parliamentary force at the 2022 Andalusian regional election with an absolute majority of seats.

The cabinet comprises members of the PP and a number of independents.

Investiture

Council of Government
The Council of Government is structured into the offices for the president and 13 ministries.

Notes

References

2022 establishments in Andalusia
Cabinets established in 2022
Cabinets of Andalusia
Current governments